Posey is a surname that is heavily concentrated in North America beginning in the 1700s.  Its prevalence outside the United States is negligible. Notable people with the surname include:

Bill Posey, U.S. representative from Florida
Buster Posey, Major League Baseball player
Carnot Posey, Confederate general in the American Civil War
Darrell A. Posey, ethnobiologist
Francis B. Posey, Indiana lawyer and politician
James Posey, basketball player
John Posey (actor), actor
John Adams Posey, Indiana lawyer and politician
John Wesley Posey, Indiana abolitionist
Parker Posey, actress
Sam Posey, American racecar driver and sports broadcast journalist
Sandy Posey, American singer
Thomas Posey, 19th-century U.S. general and politician, namesake of Posey County, Indiana
Tyler Posey (born 1991) American actor